November 2014

See also

References

 11
November 2014 events in the United States